Pakanha (Bakanha), or Ayabakan, is a nearly extinct Paman language spoken on the Cape York Peninsula of Queensland, Australia. In 1981, there were 10 speakers of the language, originally spoken by the aboriginal Pakanha people in the central part of the Cape York Peninsula.

Phonology

Vowels 
Pakanha has 5 vowel qualities:

Consonants 
Pakanha has 15 consonants:

Vocabulary/Topical Index 

The following is a sample of words from a comparative wordlist/topical index produced by Philip Hamilton. The Pakanha words are accompanied by corresponding words from the distantly related Uw Olkola and Uw Oykangand languages:

(P) = Pakanha, (Olk) = Uw Olkola, (Oyk) = Uw Oykangand.

The Body:
 Body
  (P)
  (Olk, Oyk)
  (Olk)
 Head
  (P)
  (Olk)
  (Oyk)
 Fontanel
  (P)
  (Olk)
  (Oyk)
 Skull
  (P)
  (Olk)
  (Oyk)

In popular culture 
The Pakanha word for the eastern grey kangaroo, was used as the name of a tribe on the second season of the American reality television series, Survivor in 2001.

References 

Wik languages